Little Safford Lake is located southeast of Carter Station, New York. The outlet creek flows into the North Branch Moose River. Fish species present in the lake are white sucker, black bullhead, brook trout, yellow perch, and sunfish. Trail access with permit on Webb-Inlet Trail.

References

Lakes of New York (state)